Avaratsena is a rural municipality in Madagascar. It belongs to the district of Ambohidratrimo (district), which is a part of Analamanga Region. The population of the commune was 6,523.

It is situated in a distance of 45 km north from the capital of Antananarivo. 6 villages belong to the territory of the municipality: Avaratsena, Sahalemaka, Antanetimboahangy, Mahavanona, Avaratrimanarina, Ambatomanana, Ankodondona and Malaza.

References 

Populated places in Analamanga